The Box Elder News Journal is a newspaper in Brigham City, Utah, United States. It was started in 1893. It has a circulation of 9,500.

References

External links
Official website
Digitized copies of the Box Elder News from 1904-1926 from the Box Elder Newspaper Digital Collection: Utah State University

Newspapers published in Utah
Publications established in 1893
News Journal
1893 establishments in Utah Territory